Hart to Heart is an American talk show hosted by actor and comedian Kevin Hart. The first season premiered on August 5, 2021, and concluded on August 26, 2022. The second season premiered on July 14, 2022. The series airs new episodes weekly on the streaming service Peacock.

Episodes

Season 1 (2021)

Season 2 (2022)

Production 
The series was announced in July 2021, confirming that guests would range from "musicians to a-list actors". The series is produced by LOL Studios. Kevin Hart, Jeff Clanagan, Candice Wilson Cherry, Thai Randolph, and Todd Yasui will serve as executive producers. Leslie Small directs all episodes. DLynn Proctor appears as the show's sommelier. A second season was announced on July 8, 2022.

Cast 
Kevin Hart hosts the series.

During the first season, guests for upcoming episodes were announced in the days prior to episode releases. On August 17, 2021 it was confirmed that Nick Cannon, Bryan Cranston & John Travolta would appear in future episodes. When the second season was announced, guests were revealed to include Jay-Z, Mark Wahlberg, Saweetie, Mike Tyson, Tracee Ellis Ross, Chris Rock, Tyler Perry, Pete Davidson, Simu Liu, Seth MacFarlane and Kristen Stewart.

References 

English-language television shows
2020s American black television series
2020s American television talk shows
2021 American television series debuts
Peacock (streaming service) original programming